The men's 5000 metres at the 1946 European Athletics Championships was held in Oslo, Norway, at Bislett Stadion on 23 August 1946.

Medalists

Results

Final
23 August

Participation
According to an unofficial count, 18 athletes from 12 countries participated in the event.

 (2)
 (1)
 (2)
 (2)
 (2)
 (1)
 (1)
 (1)
 (2)
 (1)
 (2)
 (1)

References

5000 metres
5000 metres at the European Athletics Championships